Gagarinsky District  is an administrative and municipal district (raion), one of the twenty-five in Smolensk Oblast, Russia. It is located in the northeast of the oblast. Its administrative center is the town of Gagarin. Population: 48,928 (2010 Census);  The population of Gagarin accounts for 64.8% of the district's total population.

References

Notes

Sources

Districts of Smolensk Oblast